Hurriya or Hurriyya (Arabic, 'freedom') may refer to:

Places
Al-Hurriya, neighborhood in Baghdad, Iraq
Hurriya, a district of Idlib, Syria
Al Hurriya Air Base, a military airbase in Iraq
Camp Hurriya, or Camp Liberty, a former U.S. military installation in Baghdad, Iraq
Huriyah al Jadidah, a village in Iraq

Sports
Hurriyya SC, a Maldivian sports club and football team
El Horreya SC, an Egyptian football club
Al-Hurriya SC, a Syrian sports club

Other uses
Al-Hurriya (DFLP), a Palestinian political newspaper 
Al-Hurriya (magazine), published in Baghdad in 1924 and 1925

See also

Ahrar (disambiguation) (for al hurr)
Hur (disambiguation)
Hurra (disambiguation)
Freedom and Justice Party (Egypt) (Ḥizb Al-Ḥurriya Wal-’Adala), an Islamist political party in Egypt